A Marvin sunshine recorder is a sunshine recorder which uses a clock type mechanism to record the sun.

External links
AMS Glossary of Meteorology: Marvin Sunshine Recorder - American Meteorological Society
Photograph of a Marvin Sunshine Recorder - NOAA Photo Library

Sunshine recorders